Jonathan Kovacs (1982, Los Angeles), known as J-five, is an American singer.

Biography
Jonathan was born in 1982 in Los Angeles. He started his singing career in early 2004 with the song "Modern Times", which was a tribute to Charlie Chaplin. The song had success in a few European countries, peaking at number one in France and reaching silver status. That year he also released his first album, Sweet Little Nothing, which mixes rock, rap, funk, jazz and folk sounds.

His father and mother, from France and Austria respectively, introduced him to groups such as The Beatles, Led Zeppelin, and The Rolling Stones, which would later prove very influential to his music. He attended North Hollywood High School. He has three sisters.

Discography

Albums
 Summer (2004) – US only; credited to Johnny Five
 Sweet Little Nothing (2005) – Europe, Australia, Japan and Russia only. No. 102 in France

Singles
 "Modern Times" J-Five (2004) – No. 1 in France (silver), No. 9 in Belgium Wallonia, No. 12 in Italy, No. 15 in Switzerland
 "Find a Way" (2004) – # 24 in France, No. 42 in Belgium Wallonia, No. 13 in Italy, No. 70 in Switzerland

References

External links
 J-five discography at Discogs

1983 births
Living people
21st-century American singers
21st-century American male singers
North Hollywood High School alumni
Singers from Los Angeles